Sir Albert Lamb (15 July 1929 – 19 May 2000), commonly known as Larry Lamb, was a British newspaper editor. He introduced the Page 3 feature to The Sun (for which he was editor from 1969 to 1972, and then again from 1975 to 1981), which saw a dramatic increase in sale in the 1970s. He also applied the term 'Winter of Discontent' to the series of strikes over the winter of 1978–79. 
He was Deputy Chairman of News Group from 1979 but was transferred to the Western Mail in Australia in 1981, and edited The Australian in 1982.

Early life
Lamb was born in Fitzwilliam, West Riding of Yorkshire, the son of Henry Lamb, a colliery surface blacksmith, and Coronetta Small. Called Albert, he adopted the name Larry from the lamb in Toytown, a BBC Children's Hour radio series.

Lamb was educated at Rastrick Grammar School.

Journalism career
Lamb was editor of The Sun from 1969 to 1972 and again from 1975 to 1981, and also of the Daily Express from 1983 to 1986.

He was northern editor of the Daily Mail in Manchester from 1968 until he was recruited by Rupert Murdoch to take over The Sun (recently bought from IPC). Lamb pioneered the paper's populist style, established the Page 3 feature, which he later regretted, and saw circulation dramatically increase. He insisted that Page 3 models were "nice girls", as "big-breasted girls look like tarts". He also applied the term 'Winter of Discontent' to the series of strikes over the winter of 1978–79. 

He was Deputy Chairman of News Group from 1979 but was transferred to the Western Mail in Australia in 1981, and edited The Australian in 1982, where he was nicknamed "Sir Loin" by staff members. He left the Group in 1983 to work for the Daily Express. In 1985, during his time as editor of the Daily Express, Lamb declared that the unconditional release of Nelson Mandela, imprisoned ANC leader in apartheid South Africa, would be "a crass error". After standing down in 1986 he set up his own public relations company, Larry Lamb Associates.

Personal life
Lamb was knighted in the Queen's 1980 Birthday Honours List on the recommendation of Margaret Thatcher.

His nickname was inspired by the Children's Hour character Larry the Lamb. After he received his knighthood, Private Eye magazine usually referred to him as "Sir Larrold Lamb."

Lamb died on 19 May 2000, aged 70. He had been in poor health since suffering a heart attack in 1992.

References 

1929 births
2000 deaths
British male journalists
British newspaper editors
Knights Bachelor
Daily Express people
People educated at Rastrick High School
The Sun (United Kingdom) editors